Manchan ,, was an early Christian saint credited with founding many early Christian churches in Ireland. Manchan probably died of famine during volcanic winters caused by the extreme weather events of 535–536, which preceded the 6th century Justinian plague of Mohill.

The Shrine of Manchan is a remarkable and unique example of Irish Urnes style art, adapted to Ringerike style, skillful in design and execution. Saint Manchan's feast day is celebrated 14 February by Orthodox Catholics, Roman Catholics, and Anglicans.

Life

The life of Manchan of Mohill is clouded by obscurity and his genealogy widely debated. Some sources identify him as Manchan of Mondrehid, a claim challenged, but many others identify him with Manchan of Lemanaghan . An exiled "Manchan the Master" at the monastery of Mawgan named in the "life of David of Wales" flourished before Manchan of Mohill. John Colgan decided "that for want of authentic documents to prove the contrary, he must consider them as different persons" as feasts and chronologies disagree.

On the authority of Colgan, and the scribes of Iona Abbey who recorded his death as 538 AD in the Annals of Tigernach,  must be considered a distinct "Manchan", born in Ireland or Wales and flourishing . He belonged to the "first order of Patrician clergy", active missionary priests accompanying or following Saint Patrick, typically Britons or Irish ordained by him and his successors.

Manchan of Mohill, uniquely among Mainchíns, founded many early Christian churches, alluded to by the Martyrology of Donegal as "" (meaning ), and the Martyrology of Gorman as "" ("").

When or where he commenced his religious course is unknown. However the translator of the Annals of Clonmacnoise disbelievingly recorded "the Coworbes of Saint Manchan [at Lemanaghan] say that he was a Welshman and came to this kingdom at one with Saint Patrick". Persons of this name from Wales include  mentioned in the "11th-century life of Cadoc" of Llancarfan in Glamorganshire, and Mannacus of Holyhead whose feast day falls on 14 October.

The sanctity of Manchán of Mohill is recorded. The Mostyn Manuscript No. 88 in the National Library of Wales records several  festivals including the 14 February festival of Manchan of Mohill. The "Martyrology of Donegal" records " Mainchein, of Moethail", and the "Martyrology of Gorman" notes "Manchéin of Moethail, Feb. 14". The Irish Annals identify , uniquely among all Mainchíns, as the Saint whose relics are venerated by the "Shrine of Manchan of Moethail", perhaps jointly.

Churches

Confirmed Manchan of Mohill church sites are –

  (Monastery of Maothail-Manachan) in county Leitrim, founded by Manchan in the 6th century.
 , County Kilkenny- Founded by Manchan in the 5th or 6th century.

Probable church sites of Manchan of Mohill would include-

  ("Grey place of Manchan") in County Offaly- Persistent claims Manchan of Mohill moved to Lemanaghan in folklore, is made more plausible by dendrochronological dating suggesting a possibility of an earlier 5th or 6th century church here at Lemanaghan. O'Donovan, and others, believed Manchan of Mohill founded Lemanaghan church.
  ("Manchan's church") in County Offaly is associated with "Manchan of Mohill/Lemanaghan" by folklore.
  ('great grey place') in County Tipperary. "Conchennaighi", meaning "dog/hound headed", could reference the Conmhaícne (Conmac, son of the hound). Conversely "Manchan of Mohill" and "Sinchell the Elder" are supposedly connected with "Conmhaícne Rein" of Leitrim, though Ó Concheanainn were supposedly a minor tribe of Corca Mogha around Kilkerrin in NE Galway. However, the meaning of the word 'Conchennaighi' is unclear. |group=n|name=ManchanLiathMore2}}

Conjectural church locations of Manchan of Mohill might include-
  in Laois- O'Hanlon, Ware, and Ussher claim Manchan of Mohill founded the church.
 Wales- The "Coarbs of Lemanaghan" claimed Manchan was Welshman who arrived with Saint Patrick.

Famine and death

The Irish Annals record a cluster of deaths for person(s) named Mochta (died 534 or 535), Mocta/Mauchteus (d. 537), and Manchán (d. 538). These entries could correlate to the one person, but one entry is unequivocal- "AD 538: Manchán of Maethail fell". Manchán probably died as a result of famines caused by the extreme weather events of 535-536. The Irish Annals cite the weather events, and resulting famine, as "the failure of bread" giving the years 536AD, and 539AD.

Christian veneration of Manchán

The 6th-century events probably had significant impact on Christianity across Ireland, the dramatic events perhaps illustrating the divinity and sanctity of Manchán to his followers. The remains of Manchan were probably preserved for a long time in the Monastery of Maothail-Manachan before being enshrined.

Protection from plague
Manchán was probably venerated for  considering his 538 death during worldwide famine, and preceded a deadly plague at Mohill.

Kilkenny
In County Kilkenny, Manchan of Mohill is recorded as patron saint of the ancient monastery at Ennisnag. Nearby, Kilmanaheen townland preserves his name.

Leitrim
In county Leitrim, Manchán is venerated as patron saint of  parish since the foundation of the Monastery of Maothail-Manachan and the Justinian plague of Mohill. John O'Donovan visiting 19th century Mohill, claimed "Monahan's (or St. Manchan's) Well is still shown there",  though the location of his holy well is forgotten. From 1935 to 2015 the GAA football park in Mohill, which officially opened on 8 May 1939, was called after him. Mohill GAA teams preserve his name. St Manchan's Primary School in Mohill, costing 2.5m was opened in 2010.

Manchán's fair (Monaghan day)  
Until the late 20th century, the renowned  festival of Manchán, was held in Mohill each year on the feast day of the Saint, or rather on the "Twenty fifth of February". The plot of the acclaimed novel by John McGahern, titled "Amongst Women", revolves around "Monaghan day" in Mohill, county Leitrim. The fair day was also infamous as the backdrop for organized faction fights in the 19th century.

Shrine of Manchán  

In the 12th century, "Ruaidrí Ua Conchobair commenced his reign by creating shrines for the relics of St. Manchan of Moethail" and Saint Comman of Roscommon. The Annals of the Four Masters states "AD 1166: The shrine of Manchan, of Maethail was covered by Ruaidrí Ua Conchobair, and an embroidering of gold was carried over it by him, in as good a style as a relic was ever covered in Ireland". His shrine could be a lost relic, but is likely identical to the Shrine associated with Manchán of Lemanaghan despite  being named as the saint being venerated.

The shrine of Manchan is an impressive box of yew wood with gilted bronze and enamel fittings, a house-shaped shrine in the form of a gabled roof, originally covered with silver plates of which traces still remain. It stands 19 inches tall, covering a space dimensioned , raised by short legs and clearing the ground surface by two and a half inches. The legs slot into metal shoes, attached to metal rings probably to be attached to carrying-poles when the shrine was leading a procession. Animal patterns of beasts and serpent fill the bosses and borders of the shrine, and one side has a decorative equal-armed cross with bosses. The animal ornament on the principal faces of the relic reveals influences of  adapted to Ringerike style. The reincarnation of centuries-old Irish metalworking techniques, such as the juxtaposition of red and yellow enamel, is seen on the shrine, and the Cross of Cong. Before the Vikings there were already varied ethnic types in Ireland, and a long disappearing "Mediterranean" stratum of architecture and costume identifiable as "Iberian" is evidenced by the Shrine of Manchan and the Book of Kells. Hewson, referring to theories of Charles Piazzi Smyth, observed the two upper compartments would have held two groups of six figurines and the two lower compartments held two groups of seven figurines, and the total represented a monthly cycle of 26 days divided into two cycles.

The ten figures adorning the shrine are newer, probably 13th century. It is believed the half-round cast-bronze figure carrying an axe on the Manchan Shine, is an early representation of Olaf II of Norway (Saint Olaf), considering the sub-Viking context of the art, and iconographical association of a man with axe. Margaret Stokes claimed a robed figurine holding a book, found buried near Saint John's Abbey at Thomas Street, Dublin, bears resemblance to the Manchan shrine figures, but "of much finer workmanship and evidently earlier date", but unfortunately she fails to expand further.

The dress and personal adornment of lay and chieftain costume of 13th-century Irish people is reflected by the figures. The wearing of the "celt" (anglicized "kilt", pron. 'kelt'), similar to the present-day Scottish highland kilt, was very common in Ireland, and all figures on the shrine of Manchán have highly long ornamented, embroidered, or pleated, "kilts" reaching below their knees, as kilts were probably worn by both ecclesiastical and laypersons. The wearing of full beards was only acceptable for the higher classes (nobles, chiefs, warriors), and it was disgraceful to present with hair and beard trimmed short. Reflecting this, all the shrine of Manchán figures have beards cut rectangularly, or Assyrian style, usually with no moustache.

The technical and stylistic similarities to the "Cross of Cong group", confirms without doubt the shrine of Manchan was crafted at the "well-defined and original" fine-metal workshop active in twelfth century county Roscommon. The shrine was likely commissioned by Bishop "Domnall mac Flannacain Ui Dubthaig", of Elphin, one of the richest episcopal see's in Medieval Ireland, and created by the master gold-craftsman named  ("Mailisa MacEgan"), whom John O'Donovan believed was Abbot of Cloncraff in county Roscommon, though firm evidence for this identification is lacking. The founder and patron saint of this workshop, might have been St. Assicus of Elphin. Ruaidrí Ua Conchobair was apparently patron of the relic, though it was monasteries rather than dioceses which commissioned metal reliquaries.

The pertinent question is the sacral function and spiritual identity underlying the shrine. Keane suggested the shrine represents a "miniature Ark", an object to be carried on "men's shoulders", an emblem of death to Noah, and those enclosed in the Ark, with their release, on delivery of the Ark, celebrated as Resurrection. Another thought-provoking theory proposes the shrine had a political context, representing an attempt by royal patrons to visually cementing political alliances through the purposeful conflation of two neighbouring saints, both conveniently named "Manchan". Murray (2013) believes, the argument these reliquaries are multivalent is compelling, when necessary evidence is presented.

 The shrine of Saint Manchan "is inventive", drawing on "a variety of traditions, including the archaic forms of the tomb-shrines to create a new and powerful statement of the saint's significance in the twelfth century".
 "The crucified figure in the sculptures from a Persian Rock Temple may assist in explaining the mummy-like figures on the Irish shrine. The similarity of the design would seem to confirm the idea that the figures were intended to signify the inmates of the Ark, undergoing the process of mysterious death, which was supposed to be exhibited in Arkite ceremonies".
 "There is a case for the equation of tent and shrine. "papilio", whence "pupall", is primarily the word for butterfly and came to mean tent from a physical resemblance, i.e. from the fact that the wings in two planes meet at an angle. The term .. Piramis (pyramis), literally "pyramid", and .. the presence of a bearer at each angle, is surely intended to suggest the Ark of the Covenant, a proto-reliquary; pyramis has more than one meaning or connotation .. I suggest that tent-shaped slab shrines were pyramides too".

There is doubt to which Irish saint the shrine is dedicated. Stokes wondered if the Annals of the Four Masters identified the wrong Mainchín. O'Hanlon and others felt a strong inference can be made that Manchan of Mohill and Manchán of Lemanaghan are identical.

Graves suggested the shrine was transferred from Mohill for some unrecorded reason. In support of this theory, the English were suppressing Monasteries in Ireland from 1540, and  Mohill was occupied by an "immense" English army. Confused folklore credits Mohill priests saving the shrine from iconoclasts by fleeing the Monastery of Mohill-Manchan to County Offaly-

 "In 1621, when St. Manchan's monastery was suppressed, some of the fugitive monks succeeded in bringing the shrine back to Le-Manchan".
 "When Mohill Abbey was destroyed in the twelfth century, the holy Shrine would have been carried back to Leamonaghan".

The association with Clonmacnoise and Clonfert might also be strong as the smaller heads on the shrine (figurines dated 13th century) are considered similar to those "on the underside of the abaci of the chancel arch at the Nun's church, Clonmacnoise, and the portal at clonfert". Before 1590 the Shrine of Manchan was hidden somewhere in Ireland, and Mícheál Ó Cléirigh writing  recorded the shrine at Lemanaghan, then situated in an impassable bog. Today the shrine is preserved at Boher Catholic church in County Offaly.

Lost biography of Manchan

James Ussher claimed to have "Vita Manchan Mathail''" (Life of St. Manchan of Mohill) written by Richard FitzRalph showing Manchan , a member of Canons Regular of Augustinian, patron of seven churches, and granted various glebes, lands, fiefs, and tithe to the Monastery of Mohill-Manchan since 608. However, there was no such thing as Canons Regular order of Augustinian, glebes, tithes back in the 5th–7th centuries, so these contemporary concepts would not illuminate the life of any Saint Manchan. John O'Donovan, James Henthorn Todd, and others, tried unsuccessfully to locate this book. Ussher's claims strongly influenced antiquarian speculation of his life story.

See also

 Mainchín and Mawgan, for various Saint Manchans. 
 Saint Berchan, Saint Caillin, Saint Senán, Saint Finnian are Irish contemporaries.
 Mannacus of Holyhead, Saint David, Cadoc, Saint Patrick, Saint Teilo, Cybi are Welsh contemporaries.

Notes

Manchan notes

Plague notes

Shrine notes

References

Citations

Sources

Manchan

Martyrologies

Ecclesiastical

Annals

Art and relics

Local folklore

Miscellaneous

Further reading

5th-century Christian saints
6th-century Christian saints
Irish Christian monks
Welsh Christian monks
People from Mohill
History of County Leitrim
538 deaths
Medieval Ireland
People of Conmaicne Maigh Rein